Alaska Wing Men is an American documentary television series on the National Geographic Channel. The show primarily follows the daily lives of bush pilots that fly to and from various small rural villages throughout Alaska. The series premiered on January 10, 2011.

List of episodes

Season 1 (2011)

Season 2 (2012)

See also
 Flying Wild Alaska
 Ice Pilots

References

External links

 

2010s American reality television series
National Geographic (American TV channel) original programming
2011 American television series debuts
Documentary television series about aviation
Bush pilots
Television shows set in Alaska
2012 American television series endings